Ellen Oppenheimer (born 1952) is an American quilter. Her work is included in the collections of the Smithsonian American Art Museum, the Rocky Mountain Quilt Museum and the International Quilt Museum. Oppenheimer also teaches art to Elementary students in Oakland, California.

References

20th-century American women artists
Artists from New York (state)
20th-century textile artists
20th-century women textile artists
20th-century American artists
21st-century American women artists
21st-century American artists
21st-century women textile artists
21st-century textile artists
People from White Plains, New York
American quilters
1952 births
Living people